This is a list of notable painters from, or associated with, Estonia.

A
Priidu Aavik (1905–1991)
Adamson-Eric (1902–1968)
Ellinor Aiki (1893–1969)
Arnold Akberg (1894–1984)
Efraim Allsalu (1929–2006) 
Toomas Altnurme (born 1973)
Jüri Arrak (1936–2022)

D
Eugen Dücker (1841–1916)

G
Eduard von Gebhardt (1838–1925)

H
August Matthias Hagen (1794–1878)
Julie Wilhelmine Hagen-Schwarz (1824–1902)
Eduard Hau (1807–1888)
Alfred Hirv (1880–1918)
Oskar Hoffmann (1851–1912)

J
Alisa Jakobi (born 1981)
Andrus Johani (1906–1941)

K
Kalli Kalde (born 1967)
Oskar Kallis (1892–1918)
Elmar Kits (1913–1972) 
Liis Koger (born 1989)
Johann Köler (1826–1899)
Jaan Koort (1883–1935)
Kaarel Kurismaa (born 1939)

L
Ants Laikmaa (1866–1942)
Malle Leis (1940–2017)
Kaarel Liimand (1906–1941)
Karin Luts (1904–1993)

M
Konrad Mägi (1878–1925)
Olav Maran (born 1933)
Lydia Mei (1896–1965)
Natalie Mei (1900–1975)
Peeter Mudist (1942–2013)
Juhan Muks (1899–1983)
Aleksander Mülber (1897–1931)

N
Navitrolla (born 1970)
Carl Timoleon von Neff (1804–1877)
Alexander Nelke (1894–1974)
Mall Nukke (born 1964)

O
Evald Okas (1915–2011)
Eduard Ole (1898–1995)
Enno Ootsing (born 1940)
Ludvig Oskar (1874–1951)

P
Tiit Pääsuke (born 1941)
Karl Pärsimägi (1902–1942)
Voldemar Päts (1878–1958)
August Georg Wilhelm Pezold (1794–1859)
Aleksander Promet (1879–1938)
Aapo Pukk (born 1962)

R
Kristjan Raud (1865–1943)
Paul Raud (1865–1930)

S
Martin Saar (born 1980)
Richard Sagrits (1910–1968)
Mart Sander (born 1967)
Erik Schmidt (1925–2014)
Karl August Senff (1770–1838)
Michael Sittow (1469–1525)
Ülo Sooster (1924–1970)
Eugen Sterpu (born 1963)
Viive Sterpu (1953–2012)

T
Aleksander Tassa (1882–1955)
Nikolai Triik (1884–1940)
Balder Tomasberg (1897–1919)
Välko Tuul (1894–1918)

U
Helge Uuetoa (1936–2008)
Aleksander Uurits (1888–1918)

V
Ado Vabbe (1892–1961)
Kuno Veeber (1898–1929)
Ülo Vilimaa (1941–2021) 
Toomas Vint (born 1944) 
Johannes Võerahansu (1902–1980)

W
Gottlieb Welté (c.1745–1792)
Eduard Wiiralt (1898–1954)

See also
 List of Estonians

Estonian painters
Estonia
Painters